Thomas Mehlhorn is an engineer at the Naval Research Laboratory in Alexandria, Virginia. He was named a Fellow of the Institute of Electrical and Electronics Engineers (IEEE) in 2014 for his work in understanding intense pulsed electron and ion beams.

References

Fellow Members of the IEEE
Living people
21st-century American engineers
Year of birth missing (living people)
Place of birth missing (living people)
American electrical engineers
Fellows of the American Physical Society